The Samsung Galaxy S21 is a series of Android-based smartphones designed, developed, marketed, and manufactured by Samsung Electronics as part of its Galaxy S series. They collectively serve as the successor to the Samsung Galaxy S20 series. The first three smartphones were unveiled at Samsung's Galaxy Unpacked event on 14 January 2021, while the Fan Edition model was unveiled at Samsung's CES on 3 January 2022.

The S21 series consists of the base Galaxy S21 model, the plus Galaxy S21+ model, the camera-focused Galaxy S21 Ultra model, and the mid-range variant Galaxy S21 FE model. Key upgrades over the previous models, in addition to improved specifications, a display with a 120 Hz adaptive refresh rate, an improved camera system supporting 8K video recording (7680×4320) for the first three models, and a super-resolution zoom of 30–100x, for the ultra model.

The first three phones were released in the United States and Europe on 29 January 2021, while the Fan Edition was released globally on 7 January 2022. The Galaxy S21 FE, S21, S21+, and S21 Ultra launch prices started at $699.99, $799.99, $999.99, and $1079.99, respectively.

The Galaxy S21 was succeeded by the Galaxy S22, which was announced on 9 February 2022.

History

S21, S21+, and S21 Ultra 
The lineup of the first three devices was unveiled at Samsung's Galaxy Unpacked event on 14 January 2021. The three devices served as the successors of the 2020 models. All devices' design scheme has changed drastically, redesigning the massive rear-camera module for a slimmer camera module incorporated with the buttons and a uniform appearance for the S21, S21+, and S21 Ultra. The base model possesses a (plastic) polycarbonate back, the only model of the three devices to attain the change. The base model attains similar specifications to the S20. The S21+ retains the specifications and design of the regular S21, in contrast to minor differences. It serves as the successor to the S20+. The S21 Ultra serves as the high-end model of the S21 series, integrated as the professional version of the lineup, and successor to the S20 Ultra. The phone became the first of the s-series lineup to have s-pen support, with limited functionality.  The S21 series discontinued sales once the Galaxy S22 were released. The phones were released on 29 January 2021.

S21 FE 
The "Fan Edition" follow-up was unveiled at Samsung's CES 2022 event on 3 January 2022. The S21 FE serves as the successor to the S20 FE, a series of mid-range variants of their corresponding Galaxy S lineup upon launch. The Fan Edition maintains the majority of the specifications and design of the S21, with slight discrepancies to meet its lower price value.  The phone was originally planned to be released in October 2021 but was delayed due to the 2020–present global chip shortage. The S21 FE was released on 11 January 2022.

Lineup 
The lineup comprises four devices, with the Galaxy S21 initially being the least expensive with a smaller screen size and a (plastic) polycarbonate back, which then is undercut later on by the Galaxy S21 FE with the same material minus the camera bump being also polycarbonate than metal. In contrast to the Galaxy S20+, the Galaxy S21+ is very similar to the S21 spec-wise, with the exception of a larger display, higher battery capacity, and glass back instead of plastic. The Galaxy S21 Ultra has an even larger screen size, battery, and a host of other improvements over the other models, including a more advanced camera setup highlighted by its 108 MP main sensor with laser auto-focus and a higher resolution 1440p display. The S21 Ultra is also the first phone in the Galaxy S series to support the S Pen, albeit sold separately and with limited functionality.

Design 
The Galaxy S21 series has a design similar to its predecessor, with an Infinity-O display containing a circular cutout in the top center for the front selfie camera. The S21 and S21 FE's back panel is reinforced poly-carbonate (plastic) similar to the S20 FE and Note 20 while the S21+ and S21 Ultra use Gorilla Glass Victus. The rear camera array has been integrated into the phone body except for the S21 FE which is made out of reinforced poly-carbonate integrated instead on the back cover and has a metallic surround; the S21 Ultra has a carbon fiber camera surround for exclusive colors.

Specifications

Hardware

Chipsets (SoC) 
The S21 line comprises four models with various hardware specifications. International and Korea models of the S21 utilize the Exynos 2100 SoC, while the U.S., Canadian, Chinese, Taiwanese, Hong Kong and Japanese models utilize the Qualcomm Snapdragon 888. The U.S., Canadian, Chinese, and international (European) models of the S21 FE use the Snapdragon 888, while Korean, Indian and Australian markets use Exynos 2100.

Display 

The S21 series feature "Dynamic AMOLED 2X" displays with HDR10+ support and "dynamic tone mapping" technology. All models except the S21 FE utilize a second-generation ultrasonic in-screen fingerprint sensor with the latter opting for an optical in-screen system instead. The S21 Ultra is also now able to use 120 Hz at 1440p unlike its predecessor(which was limited to 120 Hz at only 1080p).

Storage 

The S21 and S21+ offer 8 GB of RAM with 128 GB and 256 GB options for internal storage. The S21 Ultra has 12 GB of RAM with 128 GB and 256 GB options as well as a 16 GB option with 512 GB of internal storage. The S21 FE offers 6 GB and 8 GB of RAM with 128 GB and 256 GB options for internal storage. All four models lack a microSD card slot, which was present on the S20 series.

Batteries 
The S21, S21 FE, S21+, and S21 Ultra contain non-removable 4000 mAh, 4,500 mAh, 4800 mAh, and 5000 mAh Li-Po batteries respectively. All four models support wired charging over USB-C at up to 25W (using USB Power Delivery) as well as Qi inductive charging up to 15W. The phones also have the ability to charge other Qi-compatible devices from the S21's own battery power, which is branded as "Wireless PowerShare," at up to 4.5W.

Connectivity 
All four phones support 5G SA/NSA networks, The Galaxy S21, S21+, and S21 FE support Wi-Fi 6 and Bluetooth 5.0, while the Galaxy S21 Ultra supports Wi-Fi 6E and Bluetooth 5.2. The S21+ and S21 Ultra models also support Ultra Wideband (UWB) for short-range communications similar to NFC (not to be confused with 5G mmWave, which is marketed as Ultra Wideband by Verizon). Samsung uses this technology for their new "SmartThings Find" feature and the Samsung Galaxy SmartTag+.

Cameras 

The S21 and S21+ have similar camera setups to their predecessors but benefit from improved software and image processing. Both have a 12 MP wide sensor, a 64 MP telephoto sensor with 3x hybrid zoom, and a 12 MP ultrawide sensor. The S21 FE also has a similar camera setup to its predecessor but benefits from improved software and image processing. It has a 12 MP wide sensor, an 8 MP telephoto sensor with 3x optical zoom, and a 12 MP ultrawide sensor. The S21 Ultra has a new HM3 108 MP sensor with several enhancements over the previous HM1 108 MP sensor, including 12-bit HDR. It also has two 10 MP telephoto sensors with 3x and 10x optical zoom and a 12 MP ultrawide sensor. The front-facing camera uses a 10 MP sensor on the S21 and S21+, 32 MP sensor on the S21 FE, and a 40 MP sensor on the S21 Ultra. 4K@60 recording is supported on the ultrawide camera on the S21, S21+, and S21 FE and all cameras on the S21 Ultra. All cameras are Samsung except 12MP Ultra Wide on S21 Ultra and 10MP front on S21 and S21+, which are both made by Sony, and the 8MP Telephoto on the S21 FE which is made by SK Hynix.

The Galaxy S21 series can record HDR10+ video and support HEIF.

Supported video modes 
The Samsung Galaxy S21 series supports the following video modes:
 8K@24fps (possibly up to 30fps on S21 Ultra)
 4K@30/60fps
 1080p@30/60/240fps
 720p@960fps (480fps is interpolated to 960fps on the S21 Ultra)

Still frames extracted from high-resolution footage can act as standalone photographs.

Software 
The first three S21 phones were released with Android 11 (One UI 3.1) and Google Mobile Services, with Samsung's One UI software. While the S21 FE was supposed to be released with the same android version and One UI skin, due to it being delayed all devices are now updated with Android 12 (One UI 4.0) instead. They all use Samsung Knox for enhanced device factory reset protection (FRP) security, and a separate version exist for enterprise use.The first three S21 series smartphones were updated to Android 12 and One UI 4 on 15 November 2021. Samsung added a "repair mode" to its Galaxy S21 on 28 July 2022, hiding users' data when they entrust an ailing device to a technician.

The One UI 5 update based on Android 13 began rolling out to S21 devices on 7 November 2022.

Reception 
The Verge's review, by Dieter Bohn, praised the S21 Ultra's punchy display, fast performance, long-lasting battery life and the general improvements to the camera system, likening the latter to that of the iPhone 12 Pro Max's; however, Bohn did note that the phone's glass back is slightly more susceptible to minor scratches. Android Authority's review by David Imel noted the Samsung's Galaxy S21 Ultra "is a powerhouse smartphone" and that "the camera system in Samsung Galaxy S21 Ultra is one of the best you can get on Android". Matt Sweder at Techradar gave a positive review noting its "mesmerizing design" calling it "Samsung’s best-looking phone ever" and how "phenomenally powerful" the camera is, but also went on to criticize the price and lack of microSD card slot, and questioning the stylus support, which is a separate purchase, with nowhere to put the S Pen on the phone itself.

Criticism has been aimed at the lack of a charger and memory card-expandable storage, the latter of which existed on the preceding Galaxy S20. In 2018, Samsung made fun of iPhone's lack of the same features and an audio connector port in a series of commercials for the Galaxy S9 named "Ingenious", where unhappy iPhone customers confront an Apple Store employee over the lack of functionality that the Galaxy S9 was equipped with, a feature which has since been removed from all Galaxy phones.

Following Apple, Samsung decided not to include a wall charger or earphones when selling the Galaxy S21 series of smartphones, the reasoning being that "Samsung believes the removal of earphones and charger plugs from our in-box device packaging can help address the growing e-waste problem and unnecessary duplication of these items". However, reaching the highest charging rate possibly requires a new charger with separate packaging and shipping with standalone environmental footprint.

References 

Android (operating system) devices
Samsung Galaxy
Flagship smartphones
Samsung smartphones
Mobile phones introduced in 2021
Mobile phones with multiple rear cameras
Mobile phones with 8K video recording